Üçpınar (formerly Kiliruşağı) is a village in the Keban District of Elazığ Province in Turkey. The village is populated by Kurds of the Zeyve tribe and had a population of 69 in 2021.

References

Villages in Keban District
Kurdish settlements in Elazığ Province